Sports figurines are collectible statues of professional athletes that are usually made of plastic. They come packaged with a stand and can be connected or removed from it.

Description 

Sports figurines can usually be found in stores usually located in malls or shopping plazas that sell sports memorabilia, they can also be found in online shops or even in official professional sports websites, or even in the more popular Dick's Sporting Goods, and Figure Fanatic. It is possible to purchase one for any of the major sports in the U.S. such as the NFL, MLB, NBA, or NHL, or foreign soccer players. When a series of figurines of five to seven different athletes are released at a time, they usually consist of the more popular players and well known household names. These figurines are highly collectible with some being sold in limited quantities labeled as "limited edition". The limited edition figures have the athletes wearing different attire then a more common model, and are much harder to obtain and fetch a larger price. A common figurine has a starting price of $20 with a rarer one costing upwards of $80.

They are a step up from cards with athletes on them because of the fact they represent a 3d model of an athlete rather than a 2d image. Not to be confused with a bobblehead, sports figurines present a more serious manner in which the athlete the model is representing is performing an action commonly used in real sports such as a slam dunk, slap shot, etc. Anyone of any age can collect them if they are a sports fan, a collector, or simply trying to make a profit by reselling a rare figurine. A common place collectors buy and sell these at is the website eBay, and Amazon.

According to an article from the St. Louis Bi-State Region Report, the popularity of sports figurine continues to grow.

History 
Hartland Figurines is the most well known company of making and selling sports figurines. Hartland was founded in 1941 and was the first company to manufacture licensed sports figurines. The first series they produced was the 900 series in 1958, "using mold-injected acetate plastic resin. The figures were then hand painted using an acetate-based paint". Hartland Plastics has been producing pieces of Sports memorabilia since the 1950s. In the years since, sports action figures have been produced using hard plastic, rubber, composite materials, and even cloth and wood. Some are designed as static figurines similar to small statues while others are designed to twist, bend, and move their torsos and limbs just as a real athlete would. Many sports action figures feature intricate details, faithfully recreating the look and feel of the athletes’ uniforms, caps, equipment such as bats, gloves, or hockey sticks, and even their facial features.

Johnny Hero 
The earliest sports figurine most popularly known was Johnny Hero "in the year 1965, just a year after G.I. Joe; the figure had silk track shorts and short-sleeve shirt with trim (piping) and was produced by Rosko Industries of New York". Unlike today, figurines back then came with removable clothing. Kids could change the attire of Johnny Hero to any team they preferred. These figurines were first offered in SEARS catalogs during 1955 and 1956.  "In 1968 Johnny Hero was repackaged as Olympic Hero. The base figure was sold in a box similar to the GI Joe figures of the time. His base outfit included a red long-sleeve jogging suit (the top had "Johnny Hero" and the number 16 printed on the front), gold shorts, white socks and white tennis shoes. NFL, AFL and MLB team uniforms were sold separately. NFL / AFL uniforms included fabric jerseys and pants, shoulder and knee pads, socks, a football and a plastic helmet. Baseball uniforms included shirt, pants, socks, hat, baseball, bat and glove". Johnny Hero is well known enough today that he has his own Facebook Page.“Anecdotal research and subjective inquiry
have been aided by secondary research to
demonstrate consistency of information and opinion on this subject.”

References 

Action figures
Toy figurines